50 Eggs Films is an independent film and video production company based in Babson Park, Wellesley, Massachusetts, United States. It specializes in inspirational true stories of individuals in education, business and athletics.

Filmography

References

External links 

 Official website

Mass media companies established in 2000
Film production companies of the United States
Film distributors of the United States
Documentary film production companies
2000 establishments in Massachusetts